Coat of many colors may refer to:

 Coat of many colors, a biblical garment that Joseph owned
 Coat of Many Colors, an album by Dolly Parton released in 1971
 "Coat of Many Colors" (song), a song by Dolly Parton from the album of the same name
 Dolly Parton's Coat of Many Colors, a 2015 television film aired on NBC
 "Coat of Many Colors", an episode of The Naked Archaeologist aired on 12 November 2008